The Women's 10 km competition at the 2017 World Championships was held on 16 July 2017.

Results
The final was held at 10:00.

References

Women's 10 km
World